Little Blue Horse is an oil on canvas painting by German Expressionist painter Franz Marc, from 1912.

Description
The has the dimensions of 57.5 x 73 centimeters. It is in the collection of the Saarland Museum, in Saarbrücken. The picture depicts a young horse in the foreground, standing with its legs in a balanced position. There is a small stream at his side, and behind the horse, we can see a flowering plant in front of a mountainous landscape. The horse has a blue color, while the mountains and the sky alternate between the red, yellow, blue and orange colours.

Provenance
Marc made the painting for Walterchen, the son of his friend and colleague August Macke, a fact that the inscription at his top right demonstrates. In 1956, the museum director Rudolf Bornschein acquired the painting for the Saarbrücker Stadt-und Heimatmuseum, which in 1968 merged with the Moderne Galerie. Little Blue Horse is one of the Saarbrücker Sammlung's most famous works.

See also
List of works by Franz Marc
Blue Horses

References

Sources

External links
 

1912 paintings
Paintings by Franz Marc
Horses in art